Prof. Kotcherlakota Rangadhama Rao Memorial Lecture Award is given for the outstanding contributions in the subject of Spectroscopy in Physics. The award was established by the Indian National Science Academy of Calcutta in the year 1979. The honour is awarded to Indian citizens.

History
The Memorial Lecture Award was established in the year 1979 in the honour of Professor Kotcherlakota Rangadhama Rao by the students of Prof. K.Rangadhama Rao and Indian National Science Academy, formerly National Institute of Sciences of India, Calcutta. The lecture is awarded for outstanding contributions in the field of Spectroscopy. The award carries an honorarium of Rs. 25,000/- and a citation.

The below lists the recipients of the Memorial Award since its inception in the year 1979.

Recipients
Source: Indian National Science Academy

See also

 List of physics awards

Notes

References

 INSA Awards

Physics awards
Indian science and technology awards
Awards established in 1979